The Cockeysville Marble is a Precambrian, Cambrian, or Ordovician marble formation in Baltimore, Carroll, Harford and Howard Counties, Maryland. It is described as a predominantly metadolomite, calc-schist, and calcite marble, with calc-gneiss and calc-silicate marble being widespread but minor.

The extent of this formation was originally mapped in 1892 within Baltimore County.

Quarrying

The Cockeysville Marble has been quarried in Beaver Dam within Cockeysville and other locations in Maryland.  A historical account is given in Maryland Geological Survey Volume Two.

The Cockeysville was also mined for crushed stone at what is now called Quarry Lake.  It was known as the McMahon Quarry in the 1940s.

The Cockeysville was mined by Lafarge and by Martin Marietta Inc. at the Marriottsville Quarry, Marrtiottsville, Maryland.

The Washington Monument in Baltimore and the one in Washington, D.C. are constructed from the Cockeysville Marble.

See also
List of types of marble

References

Baltimore County, Maryland
Carroll County, Maryland
Harford County, Maryland
Howard County, Maryland
Marble
Geology of Maryland